The 2008–09 Penn State Nittany Lions basketball team represented Pennsylvania State University and completed the season by winning the 2009 National Invitation Tournament over the Baylor Bears at Madison Square Garden in New York City. Head Coach, Ed DeChellis, coached his sixth season with the team. The team played its home games in University Park, Pennsylvania at the Bryce Jordan Center, which has a capacity of 15,261, for the twelfth consecutive season. The season marked the team's sixteenth consecutive season as a member of the Big Ten Conference.

Current coaching staff

Roster

Schedule and Results

Preseason

Regular Season and Postseason 

|-
!colspan=10| Big Ten tournament

|-
!colspan=10| National Invitation Tournament

Awards

Players 
 Talor Battle
 Big Ten Player of the Week (Nov. 23)
 All Big Ten first team point guard
 Jamelle Cornley
 Big Ten Player of the Week (Jan. 26)
 All Big Ten second team forward
 2009 NIT MVP

Coaches 
 Ed DeChellis
 Big Ten Coach of the Year

References 

Penn State
Penn State
National Invitation Tournament championship seasons
Penn State Nittany Lions basketball seasons